The 1944 United States Senate elections in Indiana took place on November 7, 1944.

In January 1944, Democratic Senator Frederick Van Nuys died in office in January with one year remaining on his term in office. Governor Henry F. Schricker appointed Samuel D. Jackson to finish Van Nuys's term until a successor could be duly elected. Jackson did not run in either the special election to complete Van Nuys's term or the regularly scheduled election for the new term beginning January 1945.

Republicans won both elections. The special election was won by William E. Jenner, who served from November 18 until January 3. In the general election, Republican businessman Homer E. Capehart defeated Governor Schricker. Capehart went on to serve three terms in office.

General election

Candidates
Homer E. Capehart, jukebox businessman (Republican)
George W. Holston (Prohibition)
Henry F. Schricker, Governor of Indiana (Democratic)
Marid B. Tomish (Socialist)

Results

Special election

Candidates
William E. Jenner, former State Senator from Lawrence County (Republican)
Cornelius O'Brien (Democratic)
Carl W. Thompson (Prohibition)

Results

See also 
 1944 United States Senate elections

References

1944
Indiana
United States Senate
Indiana 1944
Indiana 1944
United States Senate 1944